Alcohol oxidoreductases are oxidoreductase enzymes that act upon an alcohol functional group.

They are classified under "1.1" in the EC number numbering system.

References

External links
 

EC 1.1